Davis Allen (born February 3, 2001) is an American football tight end for the Clemson Tigers.

Early life and high school
Allen grew up in Calhoun, Georgia and attended Calhoun High School. Davis was rated a four star recruit and committed to play college football at Clemson over offers from Virginia Tech, Duke, Wake Forest, and Ole Miss.

College career
Allen played in 15 games during his freshman season with the Clemson Tigers and was used primarily as an in-line blocker. He caught 16 passes for 247 yards and four touchdowns in his sophomore season. Davis had 28 receptions for 208 yards and three touchdowns as a junior.

References

External links
Clemson Tigers bio

Living people
American football tight ends
Clemson Tigers football players
Players of American football from Georgia (U.S. state)
2001 births